Katherine E. Aidala is an American physicist. She is a professor of physics at Mount Holyoke College and a Fellow of the American Physical Society.

Early life and education
Aidala obtained a B.S. in applied physics and psychology from Yale University in 2001. At Yale, she was involved in the Rob Schoelkopf Lab, a quantum computing research lab with a focus on superconductors. She then received her M.A. in applied physics from Harvard University, followed by her Ph.D. in applied physics from Harvard in 2006. At Harvard, she was involved in building the He-3 cooled scanning probe microscope at the Robert Westervelt Group, eventually writing her dissertation based on her research with the group, titled "Imaging Magnetic Focusing in a Two-Dimensional Electron Gas."

Career
Upon accepting a faculty position at Mount Holyoke College, Aidala received the Presidential Early Career Award for Scientists and Engineers, and an NSF CAREER award for her work in nanophysics. She was also named a Cottrell Scholar of 2009 by the Research Corporation for Scientific Advancement. In an effort to make science more approachable, Aidala started a bi-monthly SciTech Cafe and Organismic and Evolutionary Biology cafes in 2013 where local scientists could casually discuss their fields. She also established a Makerspace at Mount Holyoke College to encourage women to enter STEM disciplines.

During her tenure at Mount Holyoke College, Aidala's research has focused on charge transport in nanocrystal quantum dots. She uses scanning probe microscopy to improve the efficiency of nanostructures and the devices that employ them. In recognition of her efforts, she received the 2016 Meribeth E. Cameron Faculty Award for Scholarship. Aidala also earned the American Physical Society (APS) 2020 Prize for a Faculty Member for Research in an Undergraduate Institution.

In October 2020, Aidala was elected a Fellow of the APS "for her innovative development of scanning probe techniques to characterize soft materials, study disordered semiconductors, and apply azimuthal magnetic fields to magnetic nanostructured materials; for exceptional mentoring of undergraduate women in physics; and promoting public appreciation of science."

References

Living people
Year of birth missing (living people)
American women physicists
Yale College alumni
Harvard School of Engineering and Applied Sciences alumni
Mount Holyoke College faculty
Fellows of the American Physical Society
21st-century American women
Recipients of the Presidential Early Career Award for Scientists and Engineers